André Taupin (26 July 1909 – 4 March 1979) was a French sports shooter. He competed in the trap event at the 1952 Summer Olympics.

References

External links

1909 births
1979 deaths
French male sport shooters
Olympic shooters of France
Shooters at the 1952 Summer Olympics
20th-century French people